Daniel Afadzwu (born 16 December 1995) is a Ghanaian professional footballer who plays as goalkeeper for Ghanaian Premier League side Bechem United F.C.

Career

Mpuasuman United 
Afadwzu started his career with lower-tier side Mpuasuman United, until he secured a move to Ghana Premier League side Bechem United in 2018.

Bechem United 
Afadzwu joined Bechem United in June 2018, during the second round transfer period of the 2018 Ghana Premier League. He however did not make any appearances in 2018 since the league abandoned due to the dissolution of the GFA in June 2018, as a result of the Anas Number 12 Expose.

On 3 April 2019, during  2019 GFA Normalization Special Competition he made his debut and kept a clean sheet in a goalless draw against Ashanti Gold. He ended the competition with 11 league appearances during the, which he played 11 out of 12 league matches. The following season, the 2019–20 season, he played in 6 league matches before the league was cancelled due to restrictions from COVID-19 pandemic in Ghana.

References

External links 

 

Living people
1995 births
Association football goalkeepers
Ghanaian footballers
Bechem United F.C. players
Ghana Premier League players